Love in the Ring is a 1930 German sports film directed by Reinhold Schünzel and starring Max Schmeling, Renate Müller, and Olga Tschechowa. Schmeling was a leading German boxer of the 1930s, and the film attempted to capitalise on this. Schmeling later appeared in another boxing-themed film in Knockout (1935).

It was originally planned as a silent film, but sound was soon added as it became clear that silents were now unmarketable. The film's sets were designed by the art directors Otto Erdmann and Hans Sohnle. Some of the film was shot at the Berlin Sportpalast.

Cast
 Max Schmeling as Max - Sohn der Obsthänderlin / Son of the Fruit seller
 Renate Müller as Hilde - Tochter des Fischhändlers / The Fish seller's daughter
 Olga Tschechowa as Lilian
 Frida Richard as Maxs Mutter / Obsthändlerin / Fruit seller
 Rudolf Biebrach as Fischhändler / Fish seller
 Kurt Gerron as Max's Manager
 Max Machon as Erster Trainer
 Hugo Fischer-Köppe as Zweiter Trainer
 Julius Falkenstein as Ein Lebemann / A Bon-Vivant
 Yvette Darnys
 Arthur Duarte
 Emil Heyse
 Heinrich Gotho
 José Santa as Selbst / Himself
 Harry Stein as Selbst / Himself
 Paul Noack as Selbst / Himself
 Fritz Rolauf as Selbst / Himself
 Hermann Herse as Selbst / Himself
 Egon Stief as Selbst / Himself
 Felix Friedemann as Selbst / Himself
 Erich Kohler as Selbst / Himself
 Paul Samson-Körner as Unbestimmte Rolle / Undetermined Role
 Reinhold Schünzel as Unbestimmte Rolle / Undetermined Role

References

Bibliography

External links 
 

1930 films
Films of the Weimar Republic
German boxing films
1930s sports films
1930s German-language films
Films directed by Reinhold Schünzel
Terra Film films
German black-and-white films
1930s German films